Sekirna Spur is the rocky, partly ice-free peak rising to 776 m at the southeast extremity of Zagreus Ridge on Oscar II Coast in Graham Land.  It surmounts Hektoria Glacier to the northeast and southeast, and Paspal Glacier and Green Glacier to the west and south.  The feature is named after the settlements of Gorna (Upper) and Dolna (Lower) Sekirna in Western Bulgaria.

Location
British mapping in 1978.

Maps
 British Antarctic Territory.  Scale 1:200000 topographic map.  DOS 610 Series, Sheet W 64 60.  Directorate of Overseas Surveys, Tolworth, UK, 1978.
 Antarctic Digital Database (ADD). Scale 1:250000 topographic map of Antarctica. Scientific Committee on Antarctic Research (SCAR). Since 1993, regularly upgraded and updated.

Notes

References
 Sekirna Spur. SCAR Composite Antarctic Gazetteer.
 Bulgarian Antarctic Gazetteer. Antarctic Place-names Commission. (details in Bulgarian, basic data in English)

External links
 Sekirna Spur. Adjusted Copernix satellite image

Mountains of Graham Land
Oscar II Coast
Bulgaria and the Antarctic